The Northwest Corridor Express Lanes (formerly Northwest Corridor HOV/BRT) and locally known as the Tollercoaster, is a completed Georgia Department of Transportation (GDOT) project which has put Peach Pass-only toll lanes along Interstate 75 (I-75) and I-575 in the northwestern suburbs of the Atlanta metropolitan area. It carries traffic between northwest Atlanta and Cobb and Cherokee counties by adding two lanes for paying vehicles along I-75, with one continuing up a dedicated exit onto I-575 to Sixes Road (mile 11, former exit 6), and the other straight on I-75 to Hickory Grove Road, just past Wade Green Road (mile 273, former exit 118). North of the interchange where they split, the new lanes are located in the median, between the original northbound and southbound lanes. From the Perimeter (I-285 on the north side) to I-575, the road had already been built with 12 to 16 lanes, which required other plans, including via eminent domain.

History

Original plans
HOV-only exits would be built at roads which currently cross the highways, but have no access to it.  Bus stations would also be built at these points, with park-and-ride parking lots.  New lanes would be divided from the regular ones by concrete barriers, not just by white double-stripes as was done by GDOT inside the Perimeter.  There were originally no plans to allow or even design for later contraflow lane usage for rush hours.

Truck lanes
There were also plans to add two truck-only lanes in each direction, further expanding the highway by another six lanes (including emergency lanes). Separating traffic was proposed because it would smooth traffic and make the main lanes safer for cars.  However, it would also effectively end the subsidy the industry gets by using roads which are mainly paid for by the public (in contrast with railroads, which maintain their own tracks and pay per-mile taxes on them on top of that).

Plans scaled back
Citing the enormous cost of the plan (around four billion dollars), in summer 2009 it was scaled back to putting two barrier-separated reversible lanes on I-75 to I-575, and one in the median on each road north of there.  There would no longer be HOV exits on I-575, just slip roads to northbound and from southbound lanes for access to and from regular exits.  It was not stated how much land would be taken on the southern portion.  There was already a provision for a future HOV exit in the median at the Terrell Mill Road underpass, however the remainder has no median, only a wide left shoulder and a concrete barrier.  It was also left unknown how the lanes would tie into the interchange at I-285.

Completion
The project was completed and opened to traffic on September 8, 2018. The Cobb County bus system (CobbLinc) and the state-funded commuter bus system (GRTA Xpress) shifted the bus routes previously using I-75 or I-575 to the express toll lanes. When the lanes were opened to the public on September 8 they were toll-free for a two week trial period; however, all who used the lanes during that time were still required to have a Peach Pass (which has a minimum $20 toll load, plus other fees) to access it.  Unlike the northeast express lanes on I-85 in Gwinnett, the northwest lanes charge a toll for high-occupancy vehicles and alternative-fuel vehicles.
In 2018, the trade publication Roads & Bridges named the Northwest Corridor Express Lanes the number one road project of 2018 in the United States.

Future
The United States Department of Transportation awarded Cobb County a grant that will help pay for a project to install an exit ramp between the southern terminus of the express lanes and Akers Mill Road. The new ramp would improve access to Cumberland Boulevard from the express lanes. Cobb County's Department of Transportation expects to begin construction of the ramp in 2021.

Junction list
The mile markings of the express lanes shares the same numbering as the mainline interstates. The exits are not numbered.

Interstate 75 Express Lanes

Interstate 575 Express Lane

References

External links

Northwest Corridor HOV/BRT webpage

Transportation in Cobb County, Georgia
Transportation in Cherokee County, Georgia
Proposed bus rapid transit in the United States
Bus rapid transit in Georgia (U.S. state)
Proposed public transportation in Georgia (U.S. state)
Interstate 75
Transportation in Atlanta
Roads with a reversible lane